Sir Karl Theodore Parker,  (2 July 1895 – 22 July 1992), occasionally known as KTP, was an English art historian and museum curator. He was Keeper of the Ashmolean Museum, Oxford from 1945 to 1962 and Trustee of the National Gallery from 1962 to 1969.

Early life and education
Parker was born on 2 July 1895 in Marylebone, London. He was the younger son of Robert William Parker, a surgeon, and Marie Amélie Parker (née Lüling). He was educated at the private Bedford School, and the Lycée Saint-Louis, Paris. He then studied chemistry at the German University of Freiburg. He went on to study at the University of Zürich where he presented a doctoral thesis on 'Oliver Cromwell's reputation traced through English literature'.

Career
In 1925, Parker was appointed an assistant keeper of the print room of the British Museum. In 1934, he joined the Ashmolean Museum, University of Oxford, as Keeper of the Department of Fine Art. He additionally served as Keeper of the Ashmolean Museum (IE head of the whole museum) between 1945 and 1962. Having then retired, he maintained a link with the art world as a trustee of the National Gallery, serving as such between 1962 and 1969.

Personal life
On 14 January 1928, Parker married Audrey Isabel James. Together they had two daughters, Lavinia and Caroline. His wife predeceased him, dying in 1976.

Honours
In the 1954 Queen's Birthday Honours, he was appointed a Commander of the Order of the British Empire (CBE) in recognition of his service as Keeper of the Ashmolean Museum, University of Oxford. In the 1960 New Year Honours, he was appointed a Knight Bachelor, in recognition of further service as Keeper of the Ashmolean Museum, and therefore granted the title sir. He received the accolade from Prince Philip, Duke of Edinburgh (acting on behalf of Queen Elizabeth II) during a ceremony at Buckingham Palace on 9 February 1960.

References

External links
 
Dictionary of Art Historians - biography
The Independent - obituary

1895 births
1992 deaths
Knights Bachelor
Commanders of the Order of the British Empire
Fellows of the British Academy
People educated at Bedford School
Lycée Saint-Louis alumni
University of Freiburg alumni
University of Zurich alumni
English curators
English art historians
Employees of the British Museum
People associated with the Ashmolean Museum